Howard Bilerman (born September 25, 1970) is a Canadian musician, sound engineer, and record producer based in Montreal, Quebec. He co-owns the hotel2tango recording studio, and played drums for the band Arcade Fire.

Across his recording career, Bilerman has worked on albums by several prominent Canadian artists, including Godspeed You! Black Emperor, Wolf Parade, Leonard Cohen, Bell Orchestre, U.S. Girls and The Weather Station.

Early life and education 
Bilerman grew up in Montreal where he attended St. George's School of Montreal. He earned a bachelor's degree in communication studies from Concordia University in 1994.

Career 
Beginning in 1996, Bilerman started a studio called Mom & Pop Sounds, first in his parents' basement, then in a loft in Old Montreal. In addition to his own material under the name EAVESDROPPER, he recorded tracks for local bands such as The Paper Route, Bionic, UVBC, The Spaceshits, Tricky Woo &  Goldfish.

As of 2000, Bilerman runs the hotel2tango recording studio in Montreal along with Efrim Menuck and Thierry Amar of Godspeed You! Black Emperor and A Silver Mt. Zion, and Radwan Moumneh.

Bilerman was the drummer for the band Arcade Fire between 2003 & 2004; he recorded and drummed on their debut album, Funeral as well as acting as sound engineer. He has also drummed on songs by Thee Silver Mt. Zion Memorial Orchestra & Tra-La-La Band, Vic Chesnutt, Basia Bulat,  Sons of an Illustrious Father, Lilah Larson, Peter Peter, Rich Aucoin, Broken Social Scene and Angela Desveaux.

As a recording engineer or producer, Bilerman has a credit on over 500 records, including those by Handsome Furs, Wolf Parade, Coeur de Pirate, Lou Doillon, Perfect Pussy, Charlotte Cornfield, British Sea Power, Tricky Woo, Thee Silver Mt. Zion Memorial Orchestra & Tra-La-La Band, Thalia Zedek, CPC Gangbangs, Arcade Fire, U.S. Girls, Godspeed You! Black Emperor, Grant Hart, Bassekou Kouyate, Vic Chesnutt, The Wooden Sky, The Weather Station, The Barr Brothers, Basia Bulat, Leif Vollebekk, Sarah Davachi, Bell Orchestre, Sons of an Illustrious Father, Dan Boeckner's band Operators, and Halifax's Nap Eyes.

In 2012, Bilerman travelled to Mali to record an album by ngoni player Bassekou Kouyate, despite political unrest in the country at the time.

Bilerman is a frequent host of Pop Montreal public lectures, where he interviews fellow producers & musicians. Those include Bob Johnston, John Simon, Andrew Loog Oldham, Steve Albini, Brian Paulson, Guy Picciotto & Rough Trade Records founder Geoff Travis. He has also been a frequent instructor at Banff Centre in Alberta.

In 2016 Bilerman was one of the engineers on Leonard Cohen's Grammy award winning song "You Want It Darker".

Production discography

References

External links 

1970 births
Living people
Canadian male drummers
Canadian record producers
Anglophone Quebec people
Musicians from Montreal
21st-century Canadian drummers
21st-century Canadian male musicians